The Norcross Brothers Houses are historic houses at 16 and 18 Claremont Street in Worcester, Massachusetts. They are named after their builders and first occupants, James and Orlando Norcross, principals of the Norcross Brothers construction company.

History

The houses, which are located on the corner of Claremont Street and Woodland Street in the Main South area of Worcester, have been regarded as some of the earliest and finest examples of Queen Anne architecture in the city. They were built in 1878 and added to the National Register of Historic Places in 1980. 16 Claremont Street is home to the George Perkins Marsh Institute of Clark University. The Marsh Institute studies the human dimensions of environmental change and coupled natural and human systems.

See also
National Register of Historic Places listings in southwestern Worcester, Massachusetts
National Register of Historic Places listings in Worcester County, Massachusetts

References

Houses in Worcester, Massachusetts
Queen Anne architecture in Massachusetts
Houses completed in 1878
Clark University
George Perkins Marsh
National Register of Historic Places in Worcester, Massachusetts
Houses on the National Register of Historic Places in Worcester County, Massachusetts
1878 establishments in Massachusetts